Jacques Piou (1838-1932) was a French lawyer and politician.

Early life
Jacques Piou was born on 6 August 1838 in Angers, France. His father, Constance Piou, was a politician. His mother, Thérèse Angèle Palmyre Ledall de Kéréon, was an aristocrat.

He studied the Law.

Career
Piou started his career as a lawyer in Toulouse.

He served as a member of the Chamber of Deputies for Haute-Garonne from 1885 to 1893, and from 1898 to 1902. He co-founded Popular Liberal Action, a conservative political party, with Count Albert de Mun in 1901. He then served for Lozère from 1906 to 1919.

He authored a biography of Count Albert de Mun that was published in 1925.

Personal life
He married Julie Gentien. They had a daughter, Léonie Thérèse Piou.

Death
He died on 12 May 1932 in Paris.

References

1838 births
1932 deaths
People from Angers
Politicians from Pays de la Loire
Popular Liberal Action politicians
Republican Federation politicians
Members of the 4th Chamber of Deputies of the French Third Republic
Members of the 5th Chamber of Deputies of the French Third Republic
Members of the 7th Chamber of Deputies of the French Third Republic
Members of the 9th Chamber of Deputies of the French Third Republic
Members of the 10th Chamber of Deputies of the French Third Republic
Members of the 11th Chamber of Deputies of the French Third Republic